The High Commissioner of Australia to Singapore is an officer of the Australian Department of Foreign Affairs and Trade and the head of the High Commission of the Commonwealth of Australia to the Republic of Singapore. The High Commissioner has the rank and status of an Ambassador Extraordinary and Plenipotentiary and is currently Will Hodgman.

Posting history
The earliest formal diplomatic representation dates from 1922, when Egbert Sheaf was appointed Trade Commissioner for the East based in Singapore, the capital of the British Straits Settlements, who served until January 1925.

On 1 September 1941, the Minister for External Affairs, Sir Frederick Stewart, announced the appointment of Vivian Gordon Bowden as Australia's Official Representative at Singapore, with the aim of being the official intermediary between the Commonwealth Government and the British authorities. Bowden was supported by a Commercial Secretary, Alfred Wootton, and a Third Secretary, John Quinn. Bowden was captured following the Fall of Singapore on 15 February 1942 and was murdered by his Japanese captors two days later, despite his diplomatic status and being a non-combatant prisoner of war. With the end of Japanese occupation, Australia posted a resident Commissioner and Trade Commissioner in post-war Singapore from 1946 representing Australia in British Malaya, North Borneo, Sarawak, as well as Singapore, prior to their federation with Malaysia in 1963, when the post became the Deputy High Commission to Malaysia, reporting to the new High Commission in Kuala Lumpur.

Singapore and Australia have enjoyed official diplomatic relations since 10 August 1965, following Singapore's independence when it was expelled from Malaysia the day before on 9 August. Australia was the first country to recognise Singapore and the serving Prime Minister at the time of recognition, Sir Robert Menzies, announced "I have informed the Singapore Prime Minister that we will be happy to establish full diplomatic relations with Singapore at the level of High Commissioner and that we wish Singapore well in its new sovereignty and look forward to a continuance of close and friendly relations with the new State and with Malaysia." Prime Minister Lee Kuan Yew had made his first visit to Australia in March 1965. Bill Pritchett, who had been serving as Deputy High Commissioner to Malaysia in Singapore since January 1964, was appointed as the first High Commissioner three days after recognition, by Foreign Minister Paul Hasluck.

In 2015, Australia and Singapore celebrated 50 years of diplomatic relations alongside celebrations for 50 years of Singapore's independence.

Office-holders

High Commissioners

Prior appointments

See also
Australia–Singapore relations
Foreign relations of Australia

References

External links

Australian High Commission, Singapore

 
Singapore
Australia